Shivi was in ancient India, ruled by a democratic system of government known as ganatantra. Kshudrakas had formed a sangha with Malavas.

History of India